Below are the squads for the 2008 East Asian Football Championship tournament in Japan. There were 23 players in each squad, including 3 goalkeepers.

Coach:  Vladimir Petrovic

Coach:  Takeshi Okada

Coach:  Kim Jong-hun

Coach:  Huh Jung-moo

References

External links
East Asian Football Championship 2008 Final Competition in China
EAFC 2008 Preliminary Competition Results
Teams in the EAFC 2008 
EAFC 2008 at Rsssf

EAFF E-1 Football Championship squads